The Sigma 300 – 800 mm lens is a professional-level supertelephoto zoom lens made by Sigma Corporation from 2005 to 2019 for use with digital SLRs. It is a modification of the non-DG model Sigma 300-800mm F5.6 EX APO IF HSM was being in production in 2003–2005. Due to its massive size and weight, the lens has been nicknamed the "Sigmonster"

The first model Sigma 300-800mm F5.6 EX APO IF HSM (manufacturer code 594) was announced on 4 October 2002 and first delivered on 29 January 2003. The construction of the lens has 18 optical elements in 16 groups including 2 ELD (extra-low dispersion) elements. Versions for Sigma SA, Canon EF and Nikon AF-S mounts were available.

On 14 February 2005, the DG variants of several Sigma lenses have been announced, including the 300-800mm F5.6 EX DG APO HSM lens (manufacturer code 595). Since 29 April 2005, the lens was available for customers, replacing the previous model. The new lens has a better coating designed to reduce flare from digital SLRs sensors.

The Nikon version lost an aperture ring so the lens can be equated to Nikon G lenses in this aspect. In addition to the Sigma, Canon and Nikon versions, the Four Thirds version was announced on 26 September 2006 and produced for several years. The FT version is longer (549.4mm) and heavier (5915g) than others (data for Sigma SA mount is shown).

References

See also
List of Nikon F-mount lenses with integrated autofocus motors

300-800